The Aksumite–Persian wars were a protracted series of armed engagements between the Sasanian Persian Empire and the Aksumite Empire for control over the waning Himyarite Kingdom in southern Arabia (modern-day Yemen) in the 6th century CE. After a decisive victory at the Battle of Hadhramaut in 570, the Sasanian military marched on and besieged Sana'a, following which the Aksumites were largely expelled from the Arabian Peninsula. The Persians instated the former Himyarite king Sayf ibn Dhī Yazan as the governor of the new Sasanian province of Yemen. However, Yazan was murdered by his Ethiopian servants four years into his reign, after which the Aksumites re-established their power in the region. Following the death of Yazan, the Sasanian army mounted a second invasion and re-conquered Yemen by 575–578, marking the end of Axumite rule in Arabia. After Sasanian control was firmly established in the region, the Persian military general Wahrez was installed as the direct governor of Yemen.

Context 

Around 520 CE, Kaleb of Aksum sent a military expedition to Yemen to fight against Dhu Nuwas, a Jewish ruler of the Himyarite Kingdom who had gained notoriety for his ongoing persecution of the Christian community in Najran. Following the successful Aksumite invasion, Nuwas was deposed and executed, and Kaleb appointed a Christian Himyarite native, Sumūyafa Ashwa, as his viceroy. However, around 525, Ashwa was deposed by the Aksumite general Abraha, who declared himself as the king of the new Himyarite–Aksumite Kingdom.

After Abraha's death, his son Masruq ibn Abraha continued the Aksumite vice-royalty in Yemen and resumed payment of tribute to the Kingdom of Aksum; he ended the joint Himyarite–Aksumite Kingdom and annexed it to the Aksumite kingdom. Following these events, Masuq's half-brother Maʽd-Karib revolted against him. After being denied aid by Justin II of the Byzantine Empire, Maʽd-Karib sought help from Khosrow I of the Sasanian Persian Empire.

Course of conflict 

In response to Maʽd-Karib's request, Khosrow I sent the Sasanian military general Wahrez and his son Nawzadh to Aksumite-ruled Yemen at the head of a small expeditionary force of 800 Dailamite cavalrymen in 570 CE. The Sasanian military, onboard eight ships, sailed around the coasts of the Arabian Peninsula; although two of the ships were wrecked, the rest successfully docked in the Hadhramaut region of southern Arabia. The strength of the Sasanian expeditionary force is variously given as 3,600 or 7,500 (Ibn Qutaybah), or 800 (al-Tabari). Modern estimates place the Sasanian force's numbers at 16,000 men. The Persians sailed from the port of Obolla, seized the Bahrain Islands, and subsequently moved on Sohar, the portside capital of historical Oman; they then captured Dhofar and the remainder of Hadhramaut before landing at Aden.

During the initial invasion, Nawzadh was killed by Aksumite forces. This event led Wahrez to pursue a vendetta against the Ethiopian ruler of Yemen, Masruq ibn Abraha, who was personally executed by Wahrez at the Battle of Hadhramaut. The decisive Persian victory at Hadhramaut marked the beginning of the Aksumite retreat and the subsequent besieging of Sanaʽa by the Persians. 

Following the capture of Sanaʽa by Sasanian forces, Wahrez reinstated the former Himyarite king Sayf ibn Dhī Yazan to his throne as a vassal of the Sasanian Persian Empire. Al-Tabari reports that the defining factor of the Persian victory over the Aksumites was the panjagan, a military technology used by the Sasanian military with which the locals were unfamiliar. After the conquest of Yemen and subsequent expulsion of the Ethiopian presence there, Wahrez returned to Persia with a large amount of booty.

Ethiopian uprising and second Persian invasion 
By 575–578 CE, the Himyarite vassal king Yazan was murdered by his Ethiopian servants, following which the Aksumites returned and re-established their power in the region. In response, the Sasanian military invaded Yemen a second time, headed by a force of 4000 men and led by Wahrez. Yemen was then annexed by the Sasanian Empire as a province, and Wahrez was installed as its direct governor by the Sasanian emperor Khosrow I. Greater Yemen remained under firm Sasanian control until the rise of the Islamic prophet Muhammad in the early 7th century.

See also
Al-Abnaʽ, obsolete term used to refer to the descendants of Persian military officers and soldiers who intermarried with local Arab women during and after the Aksumite–Persian wars.
Muslim conquest of Persia, 7th-century invasion of Iran by the Rashidun Caliphate.

References

Sources 

 

 
 

6th-century conflicts
Abyssinian–Persian wars
South Arabia